Squirt is a caffeine-free, grapefruit-flavored, carbonated soft drink, created in 1938 in Phoenix, Arizona. Squirt competed primarily against The Coca-Cola Company's Fresca.

History 
Squirt was created by Herb Bishop in 1938.

In 1941, a mascot named "Lil' Squirt" was created for marketing the product. Squirt became a popular soft drink in many parts of the country, especially the West and Southwest. In the 1950s, it became commonly used as a mixer in cocktails.

The Squirt brand has changed ownership several times, and is currently property of Keurig Dr Pepper.

Product line 
Squirt is naturally flavored but contains less than 2% grapefruit juice. Like many other soft drinks, the packaging of Squirt has varied over the years. 

In 1983, Diet Squirt, the first soft drink in the United States to be sweetened with aspartame, was introduced.

In the mid 1980s, a vitamin-C-enriched Diet Squirt Plus was briefly marketed.

In the early 1990s, Squirt Sorbet, a frozen treat, was offered in Detroit area supermarkets.

Berry flavored Ruby Red and Diet Ruby Red Squirt have also been introduced. Unlike normal Squirt, Ruby Red Squirt contains caffeine.

In 2008, Squirt Citrus Power was introduced. Unlike regular Squirt, Squirt Citrus Power is caffeinated, lacks concentrated grapefruit juice, and contains taurine and other ingredients similar to an energy drink.

References 

Keurig Dr Pepper brands
Grapefruit sodas
Citrus sodas
Products introduced in 1939